Gushegu is a small town and it is the capital of Gushegu district, a district in the Northern Region of Ghana. The people in that area are usually farmers and hard workers.

Economic activities 
Majority of the people of Gushegu are farmers and the rest are traders and some has a handwork.

References 

Populated places in the Northern Region (Ghana)